The Economic Group was a political party that nominated candidates in the 1929 provincial election in the Canadian province of Saskatchewan.

The party nominated three candidates for election to the Legislative Assembly of Saskatchewan.  These candidates won 1,942 votes, which represented 0.54% of the provincial total. None of the candidates were elected. The party did not nominate candidates in subsequent elections.

Principles and Policies
The Economic Group supported ranked voting, a fuel tax to fund highway construction, and provincial health insurance Many of the Economic Group's policies were taken directly from the platform's of the Progressive Party of Saskatchewan and the Conservative Party of Saskatchewan during the 1929 election Including "sterilization of mental defectives" from the Progressive Party and a strict immigration policy from the Conservatives. However, the Economic Group would go further than the Conservatives in specifically advocating for an "Immigration Policy which will insure the permanency of British Institutions and Ideals."

See also
 List of Canadian political parties

References

External links
 https://harvest.usask.ca/handle/10388/5910 The Saskatchewan General Election of 1929 Online.

Provincial political parties in Saskatchewan
Defunct political parties in Canada